Mark Ormrod may refer to:
 Mark Ormrod (historian) (1957–2020), English historian
 Mark Ormrod (athlete) (born 1982), Australian athlete
 Mark Ormrod (Royal Marine) (born 1983), triple amputee, former Royal Marine and Invictus Games athlete

See also
 Mark Ormerod (disambiguation)